Lindenmuth is a surname. Notable people with the surname include:

Arlington Nelson Lindenmuth (1856–1950), American landscape and portrait painter
Ezekiel Lindenmuth (born 1997), New Zealand rugby union player
Matt Lindenmuth (born 1981), American snowboarder
Tanya Lindenmuth (born 1979), American cyclist